Spilarctia adriani is a moth in the family Erebidae. It was described by Rob de Vos and Daawia Suhartawan in 2011. It is found in Papua, Indonesia.

References

Moths described in 2011
adriani